Charles Jean Baptiste Florian Faider (6 September 1811 in Triest – 6 April 1893 in Brussels) was a Belgian jurist and politician.

Life
After studies and a doctorate in Liège and Leuven, Faider practiced law as an advocate before joining the Belgian civil service. He was appointed assistant prosecutor in Leuven 1837, head prosecutor in Antwerp 1842 and solicitor general in Brussels 1844. From 1852 to 1855 he served as minister of Justice under Henri de Brouckère and continued to serve as solicitor general thereafter.

Faider authored a remarkable number of publications in a great variety of legal fields of study. He was a permanent contributor to five legal journals. His most lasting contribution to Belgian law, however, are the briefs he submitted to the Cour de Cassation. Demanding that "verdicts must conform to positive law as well as the necessities created by the changes in society", he helped Belgian courts establish a judicial tradition independent from that of France.

References
 

1811 births
1893 deaths
Belgian jurists